Warriors is the fifth solo studio album by English new wave musician Gary Numan, released on 16 September 1983 by Beggars Banquet Records, it would be his last studio release on that label.

Preproduction
Gary Numan returned to England in May 1983 to record the album. He had written most of the album's material in late 1982-early 1983, while he was living in Jersey, Channel Islands (after spending a few months in Los Angeles, California as a tax exile). While Numan was working on the early Warriors material, Beggars Banquet suggested that, for the first time during his career, he should use a co-producer instead of producing the album entirely by himself (this was initially suggested by the label for Numan's previous studio album I, Assassin (1982), a suggestion Numan refused at the time). Numan was not keen at first, but WEA managing director Mike Heap promised him "a virtually unlimited promotional budget" on the album if he signed up a producer. Numan eventually decided to recruit guitarist Bill Nelson for the job, as he was an admirer of Nelson's former band, Be-Bop Deluxe. Numan claimed that Nelson was his "favourite guitar player, bar none." Unfortunately for Numan, Mike Heap was fired and the record company was no longer willing to cover all the costs for Numan's album. It was stated sometime after the release of the album WEA had, in fact, told Numan that he was reaching sales of 60,000 units, and that was satisfactory to them. Numan later remarked, "When the new people came in, I was as far from a priority act as it was possible to be. I felt as though they'd cut me down at the knees and it was the last time I got excited about a promise in the music business."

Numan later claimed that Warriors pointed the way for his artistic decline throughout the 1980s:

Recording the album
For the recording of the album, Numan retained drummer Cedric Sharpley, keyboardist Chris Payne, and guitarist Russell Bell, all of whom had played on his studio albums and tours since 1979. Pino Palladino, the bassist on Numan's previous album I, Assassin (1982), was unable to return for Warriors. At Palladino's suggestion, Numan recruited Joe Hubbard as a replacement. Bill Nelson played guitars during the recording of Warriors, giving them more prominence than they had been allowed on I, Assassin (1982). Numan asked Dick Morrissey to be the saxophonist on the album, as he admired his work on the film score for Blade Runner (1982). Numan later described Morrissey as "brilliant, a musical genius. First take, perfect, not a single note wrong." Ultimately, Morrissey would contribute to five Numan albums, from 1983 to 1991. Female backing vocals were also introduced to the Numan sound on Warriors, provided by Tracy Ackerman.

Unfortunately, Numan and Bill Nelson quarrelled during the Warriors recording sessions; both artists had different ideas as to how the album should sound, and differing philosophies on music in general. Numan later recalled:

The relationship between Numan and Nelson deteriorated to the point that Numan "would go out and play pool" while Nelson worked in the studio. Numan ultimately disliked Nelson's mix of Warriors (finding it "too tinny"), and so he remixed the album and made changes to the track listing: both "My Car Slides" and "Poetry and Power" were relegated to B-side status (their place on the album being taken by other tracks), and "Sister Surprise" and "The Tick Tock Man" were almost completely re-recorded. Nelson asked not to be credited on the final album, although he is credited on the label. Numan later conceded that Nelson "did a lot of very inventive things on [Warriors] which, because of our differences, I failed to fully appreciate at the time. To be with him in a room when he was playing guitar was an honour. I would just sit back and listen and all my antagonism would float away."

Numan floated prospective titles for the new album amongst his fanbase. Fans were given the opportunity to vote for one of three potential album titles – This Prison Moon, Poetry and Power, and Glasshouse. Numan ultimately overruled the fans' preference of This Prison Moon and chose Warriors as the album's title. Numan's image for the Warriors album, singles, and live tour (consisting of black leather costume with weapon accessories, set against a post-apocalyptic backdrop) was influenced by the film Mad Max 2 (1981). Many parts of the actual costume came from a sex shop in Soho, London.

Singles, sales and tour
The title track was released as the lead single from the album in August 1983, reaching No. 20 in the UK charts. Numan later claimed that the single's chart performance was "killed" because it was released as a picture disc, and the week it was released, the chart compilers decided that picture discs were ineligible and didn't count their sales. The single peaked at No. 12 before the picture disc sales were stripped. The album itself was released the following month, reaching number 12 on the UK Albums Chart, although four places lower than Numan's previous studio album, it did eventually sell more than I, Assassin (1982) with over 60,000 units worldwide (60% of these sales were in the UK). Even so, it was Numan's first studio album not to be released in the US, and was only available there as an import.

The album spent six weeks on the UK Albums Chart, and despite its relatively low chart placement, it gathered some of the best reviews Numan had ever had in the UK music press. In October, a shorter, re-recorded version of "Sister Surprise" was released as the second and final single off the album. It charted at No. 32, making it the lowest-charting Numan solo single up to that point. Due to Numan's dissatisfaction with Beggars Banquet who were now just the middle men between Numan and WEA and other major record companies in general, he decided to form his own record label, Numa Records, in late 1983. Numan released his next three studio albums through Numa Records.

Warriors was supported by a 40-date UK tour from September to October 1983 (with support from robotic mime and music duo Tik and Tok). These were Numan's first live dates in the UK since his Wembley farewell concerts in 1981. Numan's friend and former bassist, Paul Gardiner, made an onstage appearance during a "Warriors" show at the Hammersmith Odeon, London. To date, no live albums or videos from the 1983 tour have been officially released, although the BBC did record the final night at the Hammersmith Odeon, and the 20 October show in Glasgow is believed to have been professionally filmed. Bootleg-quality audio from that Glasgow show has surfaced on YouTube, along with more professional-quality audio from the tour's 10 June 1983 Leicester date.

The popular music fortnightly Smash Hits ran a three-page feature on the tour titled "The Mad Max Factor" featuring an interview with Numan and several photographs of the show and Numan and the performers backstage, and a candid look at the fans who attended the shows.

Warriors was issued on compact disc in 1993 as part of a double disc set with Numan's 1979 album The Pleasure Principle (cat. BEGA 154 CD). Each album came with several extra tracks. A remastered version of the Warriors album was released on CD in 2002, with six bonus tracks.

Track listing
All songs are written by Gary Numan except for "I Am Render", with music by John Webb, and lyrics by Numan.

Side one
"Warriors" – 5:50
"I Am Render" – 4:56
"The Iceman Comes" – 4:25
"This Prison Moon" – 3:18
"My Centurion" – 5:22

Side two
"Sister Surprise" – 8:29
"The Tick Tock Man" – 4:22
"Love Is Like Clock Law" – 4:00
"The Rhythm of the Evening" – 5:54

 The song "I Am Render" is based on Roger Zelazny's sci-fi novel The Dream Master (the novel's protagonist is Dr. Charles Render).
 The song "My Centurion" was inspired by Numan's near-fatal 1982 plane crash. (The aircraft involved was a Cessna T210L Centurion.)

Bonus tracks on the 1993 reissue
"My Car Slides (1)" ("Warriors" B-side) – 3:01
"My Car Slides (2)" ("Warriors" B-side) – 4:42
"Poetry and Power" ("Sister Surprise" B-side) – 4:25
"Face to Face (Letters)" – 3:46
"Cars" ('E' Reg Extended Model) – 6:12
"Cars" (Motorway Mix) – 4:30

 "Face to Face (Letters)" originally appeared on the B-side of the 12" single of 1981's "Love Needs No Disguise" by Dramatis and Numan, where it was titled "Face to Face". It was later included on the 12" single of "Sister Surprise" where it was mistakenly titled "Letters". The track was excluded from future reissues of Warriors and instead featured on reissues of Dance (1981), matching its original year of release. 
 The remixes of "Cars" included here were both from 1987.

Bonus tracks on the 2002 reissue
"Poetry and Power" ("Sister Surprise" B-side) – 4:25
"My Car Slides (1)" ("Warriors" B-side) – 3:01
"My Car Slides (2)" ("Warriors" B-side) – 4:42
"Nameless and Forgotten" – 5:02
"Sister Surprise" (single version) – 4:52
"Warriors" (full-length version) – 7:30

 The version of "Poetry and Power" included as a bonus track is longer than the original version from the "Sister Surprise" single. Also, it does not fade out as the B-side version does, due to the remastering process undertaken on the original mastertapes.
 "Nameless and Forgotten", originally titled "Gangster Strut", is a demo recording, featuring elements which were later developed into "Sister Surprise" and "This Is New Love" (the latter being a track on Numan's 1984 studio album Berserker). The existence of the track was forgotten by everyone, including Numan, until it was rediscovered during research for the album reissue. The title "Nameless and Forgotten" was suggested by Numan as a fitting one.

Personnel
Musicians
 Gary Numan – vocals, keyboards, guitar, percussion
 Joe Hubbard – bass guitar
 Cedric Sharpley – drums, percussion
 Bill Nelson – guitar, keyboards, chorus on "Poetry and Power"
 Russell Bell – guitar
 Chris Payne – keyboards, viola
 John Webb – keyboards, percussion
 Dick Morrissey – saxophone
 Tracy Ackerman – backing vocals
 Terry Martin – keyboards on "The Tick Tock Man"

Production and artwork
 Gary Numan – producer, audio mixing
 Nick Smith – engineer
 Pete Buhlmann – engineer, audio mixing
 John Webb – assistant engineer
 Mark Brown – assistant engineer
 Ray Staff – audio mastering
 John Dent – audio mastering (remastered version)
 Steve Webbon – CD Layout, additional design
 Steve Malins – sleeve notes
 Patti Burris – make-up

References

External links
 

Gary Numan albums
1983 albums
Beggars Banquet Records albums